Difluorosilane is a gaseous chemical compound with formula SiH2F2. It can be considered as a derivative of silane with two hydrogen atoms replaced with fluorine.

Production
Difluorosilane can be made by fluorinating dichlorosilane with antimony trifluoride.  

3 SiH2Cl2 + 2 SbF3 → 3 SiH2F2 + 2 SbCl3

Some is also made in a reaction of silicon tetrafluoride with hydrogen

SiF4 + 2 H2 → SiH2F2 + 2 HF

Traces of difluorosilane are made when coal is burnt.

Properties
Difluorosilane is a gas with boiling point −77.8 °C, and a freezing point of −122 °C. It has no colour. The silicon–fluorine bond length in difluorosilane is 1.358 Å which is greater than that in fluorosilane but less than the length in trifluorosilane.

Reactions
In an electric discharge, hydrogen atoms are preferentially removed from the molecule and SiHF2SiHF2 is formed along with hydrogen.

2 SiH2F2 → SiHF2SiHF2 + H2

At elevated temperatures, difluorosilane can disproportionate by swapping hydrogen and fluorine atoms between molecules to form fluorosilane and trifluorosilane.

Use
Difluorosilane is used in dental varnish in order to prevent tooth cavities.

Difluorosilane is also used in chemical vapour deposition to deposit silicon nitride films.

References

Fluorine compounds
Silicon compounds
Gases